Cariou v. Prince, 714 F.3d 694 (2d Cir. 2013) is a copyright case in the United States Court of Appeals for the Second Circuit, on the question of whether artist Richard Prince's appropriation art treatment of Patrick Cariou's photographs was a copyright infringement or a fair use. The Second Circuit held in 2013 that Prince's appropriation art could constitute fair use, and that a number of his works were transformative fair uses of Cariou's photographs. The Court remanded to the United States District Court for the Southern District of New York for reconsideration of five of Prince's works. The Supreme Court denied Cariou's petition for a writ of certiorari, and the case settled in 2014.

Background

Photographer Patrick Cariou published in 2000 Yes, Rasta a book of black and white photographs of the Rastafarian community in Jamaica. Richard Prince in 2008 created Canal Zone, a series of art works incorporating Cariou's photographs. Prince's works involved copying the original photographs and engaging in a variety of transformations. These included printing them, increasing them in size, blurring or sharpening, adding content (sometimes in color), and sometimes compositing multiple photographs together or with other works. Prince exhibited his collection at Gagosian Gallery in New York as appropriation art.

In 2009, Cariou filed a copyright infringement suit against Richard Prince, as well as Gagosian Gallery, Larry Gagosian (the founder and owner of the gallery), and RCS MediaGroup (which printed the exhibit catalog).

Findings
The Southern District of New York (SDNY), in March 2011, held that Prince's works were infringing. At that point, the Cariou v. Prince case received significant attention, because the SDNY ordered that Prince's unsold works, and Rizzoli's catalogs, be impounded and destroyed. The SDNY found that the works were not transformative, in part because Richard Prince did not claim to be "commenting upon" the original works.

Prince, whose works often sell in galleries for many thousands of dollars, appealed to the Second Circuit. The case was of high interest to the art world, which largely favored Prince's position, and to the photographic community, which largely favored Cariou's position.

In April 2013, the Second Circuit reversed the SDNY's decision, finding that most of Prince's works were indeed "transformative" to a "reasonable observer" and therefore fair use. In particular, the Court found that the lower court erred in requiring that the appropriating artist claim to be commenting on the original work, and found works to be transformative if they presented a new aesthetic. The court found 25 of 30 works to be transformative fair use under its standard, and remanded the case to the lower court for reconsideration of 5 of the works under the Second Circuit's new standard.

On March 18, 2014, Cariou and Prince announced that they had settled the case.

Notes

Further reading  
 "Second Circuit Holds that Appropriation Artwork Need Not Comment on the Original To Be Transformative: Cariou v. Prince, 714 F.3d 694 (2d Cir. 2013)", 127 Harv. L. Rev. 1228 (2014)

External links

2013 in United States case law
United States Court of Appeals for the Second Circuit cases
United States copyright case law
Fair use case law
Photography in the United States